In logic, negation, also called the logical complement, is an operation that takes a proposition  to another proposition "not ", written ,  or . It is interpreted intuitively as being true when  is false, and false when  is true. Negation is thus a unary logical connective. It may be applied as an operation on notions, propositions, truth values, or semantic values more generally. In classical logic, negation is normally identified with the truth function that takes truth to falsity (and vice versa).

Definition
Classical negation is an operation on one logical value, typically the value of a proposition, that produces a value of true when its operand is false, and a value of false when its operand is true. Thus if statement  is true, then  (pronounced "not P") would then be false; and conversely, if  is false, then  would be true.

{| class="wikitable" style="text-align:center; background-color: #ddffdd;"
|- bgcolor="#ddeeff"
|  || 
|-
|  || 
|-
|  || 
|}

Negation can be defined in terms of other logical operations. The idea here is that any contradiction is false, and while these ideas work in both classical and intuitionistic logic, they do not work in paraconsistent logic, where contradictions are not necessarily false.

Algebraically, classical negation corresponds to complementation in a Boolean algebra, and intuitionistic negation to pseudocomplementation in a Heyting algebra. These algebras provide a semantics for classical and intuitionistic logic, respectively.

Notation
The negation of a proposition  is notated in different ways, in various contexts of discussion and fields of application. The following table documents some of these variants:

The notation Np is Łukasiewicz notation.

Regardless how it is notated or symbolized, the negation  can be read as "it is not the case that ", "not that ", or usually more simply as "not ".

Properties

Double negation

Expressed in symbolic terms, . In intuitionistic logic, a proposition implies its double negation, but not conversely. This marks one important difference between classical and intuitionistic negation. Algebraically, classical negation is called an involution of period two.

However, in intuitionistic logic, the weaker equivalence  does hold. Composing that last implication with triple negation  implies that  .

As a result, in the propositional case, a sentence is classically provable if its double negation is intuitionistically provable. This result is known as Glivenko's theorem.

Distributivity

De Morgan's laws provide a way of distributing negation over disjunction and conjunction:

,  and
.

Linearity
Let  denote the logical xor operation. In Boolean algebra, a linear function is one such that:

If there exists ,
,
for all .

Another way to express this is that each variable always makes a difference in the truth-value of the operation, or it never makes a difference. Negation is a linear logical operator.

Self dual
In Boolean algebra, a self dual function is a function such that:

 for all
.
Negation is a self dual logical operator.

Negations of quantifiers 
In first-order logic, there are two quantifiers, one is the universal quantifier  (means "for all") and the other is the existential quantifier  (means "there exists"). The negation of one quantifier is the other quantifier ( and ). For example, with the predicate P as "x is mortal" and the domain of x as the collection of all humans,  means "a person x in all humans is mortal" or "all humans are mortal".

Rules of inference

There are a number of equivalent ways to formulate rules for negation. One obtains the rules for intuitionistic negation the same way but by excluding double negation elimination.

Negation introduction states that if an absurdity can be drawn as conclusion from  then  must not be the case (i.e.  is false (classically) or refutable (intuitionistically) or etc.). Negation elimination states that anything follows from an absurdity. Sometimes negation elimination is formulated using a primitive absurdity sign . Together with double negation elimination one may infer our originally formulated rule, namely that anything follows from an absurdity.

Then negation introduction and elimination are just special cases of implication introduction (conditional proof) and elimination (modus ponens). In this case one must also add as a primitive rule ex falso quodlibet.

Programming language and ordinary language

As in mathematics, negation is used in computer science to construct logical statements.

if (!(r == t))
{
    /*...statements executed when r does NOT equal t...*/
}

The exclamation mark "!" signifies logical NOT in B, C, and languages with a C-inspired syntax such as C++, Java, JavaScript, Perl, and PHP. "NOT" is the operator used in ALGOL 60, BASIC, and languages with an ALGOL- or BASIC-inspired syntax such as Pascal, Ada, Eiffel and Seed7. Some languages (C++, Perl, etc.) provide more than one operator for negation. A few languages like PL/I and Ratfor use ¬ for negation. Most modern languages allow the above statement to be shortened from if (!(r == t)) to if (r != t), which allows sometimes, when the compiler/interpreter is not able to optimize it, faster programs.

In computer science there is also bitwise negation. This takes the value given and switches all the binary 1s to 0s and 0s to 1s.  See bitwise operation.  This is often used to create ones' complement or "~" in C or C++ and two's complement (just simplified to "-" or the negative sign since this is equivalent to taking the arithmetic negative value of the number) as it basically creates the opposite (negative value equivalent) or mathematical complement of the value (where both values are added together they create a whole).

To get the absolute (positive equivalent) value of a given integer the following would work as the "-" changes it from negative to positive (it is negative because "x < 0" yields true)

unsigned int abs(int x)
{
    if (x < 0)
        return -x;
    else
        return x;
}

To demonstrate logical negation:

unsigned int abs(int x)
{
    if (!(x < 0))
        return x;
    else
        return -x;
}

Inverting the condition and reversing the outcomes produces code that is logically equivalent to the original code, i.e. will have identical results for any input (note that depending on the compiler used, the actual instructions performed by the computer may differ).

This convention occasionally surfaces in ordinary written speech, as computer-related slang for not.  For example, the phrase !voting means "not voting".  Another example is the phrase !clue which is used as a synonym for "no-clue" or "clueless".

Kripke semantics
In Kripke semantics where the semantic values of formulae are sets of possible worlds, negation can be taken to mean set-theoretic complementation (see also possible world semantics for more).

See also

 Affirmation and negation (grammatical polarity)
 Ampheck
 Apophasis
 Binary opposition  
 Bitwise NOT  
 Contraposition
 Cyclic negation
 Logical conjunction  
 Logical disjunction  
 Negation as failure  
 NOT gate  
 Plato's beard
 Square of opposition  
 Truth function  
 Truth table

References

Further reading 
 Gabbay, Dov, and Wansing, Heinrich, eds., 1999. What is Negation?, Kluwer.
 Horn, L., 2001. A Natural History of Negation, University of Chicago Press.
 G. H. von Wright, 1953–59, "On the Logic of Negation", Commentationes Physico-Mathematicae 22.
 Wansing, Heinrich, 2001, "Negation", in Goble, Lou, ed., The Blackwell Guide to Philosophical Logic, Blackwell.

External links

 
 NOT, on MathWorld
 Tables of Truth of composite clauses
 
 
 
 

Semantics
Logical connectives
Unary operations
Articles with example C++ code
Formal semantics (natural language)